Hveravellir is a geothermal field (high temperature field) of the Oddnýjarhnjúkur-Langjökull  subglacial volcanic system in the north of Langjökull glacier.

Description

Hveravellir geothermal area is a small nature reserve and a tourist centre located in 600 m a.s.l. at the Kjölur mountain route between the glaciers Hofsjökull and Langjökull, Central Iceland. It is part of the Oddnýjarhnjúkur-Langjökull volcanic system. The place has been a popular resting place in highland travels since the age of settlement, 1100-1200 years ago. It is frequently mentioned in the old sagas, annals and folklore. Refuge huts have been situated there from the early beginning. The main geothermal activity is at the northern border of the large lava shield Kjalhraun . The main geothermal area covers around 2.5 km². The hot springs are of various types, geysers, fumaroles, solfataras, boiling pits and warm springs with lower temperatures. The currently active geysers only have small irregular eruptions. Sinter and geyserite is prominent, forming low and wide domes around active or extinct geothermal centres. A continuation of the thermal area can be traced several km towards north were several hot springs are found.

The oldest excoct description of Hveravellir dates back to 1752 when Icelandic travelers Eggert Ólafsson (1726–1768) and Bjarni Pálsson (1719–1779) described the field in their travel report on the island.  The geothermal field is a tourist attraction; a bath can be taken in the pool created by damming the hot water stream in 1950. Hveravellir is a declared natural monument.

Climate

See also
 List of volcanoes in Iceland

References

West Volcanic Zone of Iceland
Highlands of Iceland